John Beck is a British songwriter, producer, keyboard player and guitarist known for his work with Tasmin Archer and Corinne Bailey Rae. 
 
Beck was signed to EMI Records along with Archer after writing her first hit, "Sleeping Satellite", which went on to be a #1 hit in 16 countries. The album sold 1.5 million copies and went on to receive a Brit Award.

Beck has subsequently been Grammy- and Ivor Novello Award-nominated. In 2008, he won ASCAP's Song of the Year award for "Put Your Records On", a song he co-wrote with Bailey Rae and Steve Chrisanthou, performed by Bailey Rae.

References

External links 
 AllMusic

Living people
British songwriters
British record producers
British rock keyboardists
British male guitarists
Year of birth missing (living people)
Place of birth missing (living people)
British male songwriters